Roger fitz Richard, Lord of Warkworth and Clavering, was a prominent 12th-century English noble. He was a son of Richard fitz Eustace and Albreda de Lisours.

Life 
Roger was a son of Richard fitz Eustace and Albreda de Lisours. Roger was the constable of Newcastle Castle, Newcastle upon Tyne and received by gift of King Henry II of England, the manor of Warkworth, Northumberland in 1157. John fitz Richard his brother was the Constable of Chester and another brother, Robert fitz Richard, was the prior of the Knights Hospitaller in England. During 1163, he was given the manor of Clavering, Essex and the hand of Alice de Vere, after the forfeiture and taking of the habit of Henry of Essex. In 1174, during King William I of Scotland's raid into Northumberland, Roger's castle of Warkworth was destroyed and Newcastle Castle was reinforced with troops, so that the King of Scotland did not attempt to siege the castle.

Family 
Roger married Adelisa (Alice), former wife of Henry de Essex, a daughter of Aubrey de Vere and Alice de Clare, they had the following known issue:
Robert of Warkworth and Clavering, married Margery de Chesney; had issue.

Citations

References 
 Dugdale, William. The Baronage of England, Volume 1. G. Olms, 1675. 
 Hodgson, John & others. A history of Northumberland: in three parts, Part 1. E. Walker, 1858. 

12th-century English people
1177 deaths
Anglo-Normans
Norman warriors
Year of birth unknown
People from Warkworth, Northumberland